Sherry Bain was an actress from Angeles, California.  She started her career in some exploitation films. She co-starred with Robert Fuller in The Hard Ride in 1971, Wild Riders in 1971,  The Ballad of Billie Blue in 1972, an episode of Bearcats!, Pipe Dreams in 1976, Poco... Little Dog Lost in 1977, and Wild and Wooly in 1978. By the early 1970s, her career was moving and she was on the verge of major stardom.

Early life 
Bain was the daughter of restaurant owners. Her parents ran The Sportsman Restaurant.  She grew up in the resort town of Lake Arrowhead, which is in the mountains above Los Angeles. She attended the Rim of the World High School and graduated from there.

Career
One day Bain's fate changed and a man came in to the supermarket where she was currently working. His name was John Cestare. She began studying acting with him and gradually the negative things she thought about herself went away. At the age of 29, she had gained confidence in herself that she needed. Then she began acting. Her first few films were mainly biker films and she had the lead roles in them.

Biker genre
The first of the biker films was The Hard Ride which starred Robert Fuller. She played the part of the girlfriend of a black soldier who was killed in Vietnam. His friend (Played by Fuller) brings his body home and locates the biker club he belonged to. After the funeral she tries to understand the biker life. The film which was also called Carry Me Home Brother, premiered at Victorville. Bain was outside on the street with her mentor John Cestare and was signing autographs. She was aged 22 at the time and already had the Hollywood familiarity and a desire to stay in the business. She attracted the right kind of attention and had some very good reviews for her work in the film. A reviewer in The Los Angeles Times said the film really belonged to her and she was convincingly tough with her characterization of a complex woman. Daily Variety remarked on her striking screen presence, dramatic range and an ability to handle a range of screen roles.  And from The San Diego Union, the reviewer said her performance was the best part of the movie. Her next biker film was The Wild Riders which also starred Alex Rocco, Elizabeth Knowles and Arell Blanton. Two bikers are kicked out of their club and they head to California. There they become a nightmare for two women, played by Bain and Knowles. Her next biker film was the Duke Kelly directed Ride the Hot Wind which starred Tommy Kirk, Cheryl Waters, Duke Kelly and Richard Ford Grayling.

1970s to 1980s
By the early 1970s, she was on the verge of achieving major stardom.

Bain had the guest lead role in The Basic Moment which was an episode of Marcus Welby, M.D. split into two parts, playing the part of  Evy Weckner.  This was aired in 1972. Also that year she appeared in the TV movie, A Very Missing Person. Another film in 1972 was The Ballad of Billie Blue, a Christian themed film that starred Jason Ledger, Renny Roker, Ray Danton, and  featured Erik Estrada in an early role. She appeared in the John Cassavetes directed film Opening Night which was released in 1977.
She played the part of Jessica in the Philip Leacock directed western, Wild and Wooly which was released in 1978.

One of her last films was El Norte. By 1985 she had called it quits.

Later years
Since leaving the acting profession, Bain had become a Christian and had settled in Palm Springs and was working with children that had developmental issues. She also became the author and illustrator of children's books, one of which was Benjamin Gets Saved, a story about a rabbit.

Filmography

References

External links
Sherry Bain on IMDb
 Website

Further reading
 The Sedalia Democrat , Friday, August 11, 1972 Acting Made Sherry Bain a New Girl By Dick Klein
 Lubbock Avalanche-Journal Sunday, December 17, 1972 Beautiful Young Actress Is Living Evidence That A Good Favor Really Deserves Another By Dick Klektejr 
 Orlando Sentinel, February 1, 1998 A 'Hard Ride To Happiness', Does She Miss Hollywood? No Way, Tavares Author says By Ramsay Campbell

1948 births
Actresses from Los Angeles
20th-century American actresses
Living people
21st-century American women